Jorge Daniel Lencina (born March 26, 1976, in Córdoba) is a retired male judoka from Argentina. He claimed the bronze medal in the Men's Bantamweight (– 60 kg) division at the 1995 Pan American Games in Mar del Plata. Lencina represented his native country in three consecutive Summer Olympics, starting in 1996. He competed in the Paralympic Games in 2008 and 2012.

References

External links
 

1976 births
Living people
Argentine male judoka
Judoka at the 1995 Pan American Games
Judoka at the 1999 Pan American Games
Judoka at the 1996 Summer Olympics
Judoka at the 2000 Summer Olympics
Judoka at the 2004 Summer Olympics
Olympic judoka of Argentina
Paralympic judoka of Argentina
Pan American Games bronze medalists for Argentina
Pan American Games medalists in judo
South American Games gold medalists for Argentina
South American Games medalists in judo
Competitors at the 2002 South American Games
Medalists at the 2012 Summer Paralympics
Paralympic medalists in judo
Paralympic bronze medalists for Argentina
Judoka at the 2008 Summer Paralympics
Judoka at the 2012 Summer Paralympics
Medalists at the 1999 Pan American Games
Medalists at the 2011 Parapan American Games
Medalists at the 2015 Parapan American Games
Sportspeople from Córdoba, Argentina
20th-century Argentine people
21st-century Argentine people